Wawan Hendrawan (born 8 January 1983 in Brebes Regency) is an Indonesian professional footballer who plays as a goalkeeper for Liga 1 club RANS Nusantara.

Club career 
On 11 December 2014, he joined Mitra Kukar.

International career
He made his debut for the Indonesia in the 2022 FIFA World Cup qualification against United Arab Emirates on 10 October 2019.

Career statistics

Club

International

Honours

Club

Bali United
 Liga 1: 2019, 2021–22

Individual
 Liga 1 Team of the Season: 2019
Indonesian Soccer Awards: Best Goalkepper 2019
Indonesian Soccer Awards: Best 11 2019

References

External links 
 
 

1983 births
Association football goalkeepers
Living people
Indonesian footballers
Indonesia international footballers
Liga 1 (Indonesia) players
Indonesian Premier Division players
Persikabo Bogor players
Persikab Bandung players
Pelita Jaya FC players
Persita Tangerang players
Persisam Putra Samarinda players
Deltras F.C. players
Mitra Kukar players
Persiba Balikpapan players
Borneo F.C. players
Bali United F.C. players
RANS Nusantara F.C. players
People from Brebes Regency
Sportspeople from Central Java